South Hill Historic District may refer to:

 South Hill Historic District (Lexington, Kentucky), listed on the National Register of Historic Places (NRHP) in Fayette County, Kentucky
 South Hill Historic District (Bellingham, Washington), listed on the NRHP in Whatcom County, Washington